FC Torpedo Izhevsk was a Russian football team from Izhevsk. It played professionally in 1992 and 1993. Their best result was 15th place in Zone 5 of the Russian Second Division in 1992.

Team name history
 1992: FC Torpedo-UdGu Izhevsk
 1993: FC Torpedo Izhevsk

External links
  Team history at KLISF

Association football clubs established in 1992
Association football clubs disestablished in 1994
Defunct football clubs in Russia
Football clubs in Izhevsk
1992 establishments in Russia
1994 disestablishments in Russia